Imashirozuka Kofun is a Kofun that is located in Takatsuki, Osaka in Japan. The Kofun was designated a National Historic Site of Japan.

References

External links 

 
 

Kofun
Takatsuki, Osaka
History of Osaka Prefecture
Historic sites in Japan